Sotheron is a surname. Notable people by that name include:

 T. H. S. Sotheron-Estcourt (1801–1876), British Conservative politician
 George Sotheron-Estcourt, 1st Baron Estcourt (1839–1915), British Conservative Party politician.
 Frank Sotheron  (1765–1839), member of Parliament for Nottinghamshire.
 Thomas E. Sotheron-Estcourt (1881–1958), British Army officer and Conservative Member of Parliament.
 John de Sotheron (died after 1398), English landowner, lawyer and judge, who was Lord Chief Justice of Ireland.

See also
Estcourt (surname)